Mercurio Peruano was a newspaper published in Peru between 1790 and 1795. It was the first scientific paper in the country. Over 400 editions were published.

History
The paper was created by a circle of young intellectuals of the Peruvian Enlightenment. Subject matter was diverse, but focused on Peru and Peruvians. The Mercurio Peruano not only was an important newspaper of the Century of the Lights but also the first clearly Peruvian newspaper. Jean-Pierre Clément, Professor of Literature and Spanish and Spanish-American Civilization in the University of Poitiers, dedicated more than 20 years to the study of the Mercurio Peruano and has presented a summary of his investigations, including a selection of typical articles and an analysis of technical and administrative matters regarding the paper.

See also
 List of newspapers in Peru
 Media of Peru

References

History of Peru